Mehmet Zafer Çağlayan (born 10 November 1957 in Muş) is a Turkish politician and former Minister. He is a member of parliament from the ruling Justice and Development Party and the former Minister of Economic Affairs under Prime Minister Recep Tayyip Erdoğan.

Biography
Born to a Turkish-Kurdish family, Çağlayan graduated with a degree in mechanical engineering from Gazi University in Ankara in 1980 and went on to a career in the aluminum industry. Before his election to parliament and appointment as minister in August 2007 he was president of the Ankara Chamber of Industry and vice-president of the Union of Chambers and Commodity Exchanges of Turkey, who have been lobbying for structural and micro-economic reforms. He was the chairman of two companies namely Akel Alüminyum A.Ş and Çağlayanlar Alüminyum Limited.

Çağlayan is married and has two children.

2013 corruption scandal
On 17 December 2013, his son Salih Kaan Çağlayan was arrested for  involvement in the 2013 corruption scandal. Zafer Çağlayan and two other ministers, namely Minister of the Interior Muammer Güler and Minister of Environment and Urban Planning Erdoğan Bayraktar, resigned on 25 December 2013, although Çağlayan and Güler remained as MPs. Former ministers deny the accusations.
 
On 28 February 2014, Salih Kaan Caglayan has been released with two other people. The Istanbul prosecutor has decided not to proceed against the 53 accused in the December 17 corruption probe, the Public Prosecutor's Office announced on 17 October 2014.
On 5 January 2015, A Turkish parliamentary committee has cleared four former ministers of corruption charges. The charges were cancelled. The investigation followed controversial police probes into the allegations, which the government and President Recep Tayyip Erdogan described as a coup attempt by police. On 21 January 2015,The Turkish parliament voted on Wednesday not to send to trial four former ministers accused of wrongdoing in a corruption investigation.

Anti-semitic remarks
On 8 March 2014, during a public rally for his Justice and Development Party, Çağlayan spoke to the crowds. On the topic of the corruption scandal, he accused the instigators of the investigation of seeking to undermine the government and said:

...I would understand if a Jew, an atheist, a Zoroastrian would do all these things to us. Shame on them if these things are done by those who claim to be Muslim. How can a Muslim do this?

Çağlayan's remarks sparked further controversy in Turkey, with the Turkish Jewish Congregation issuing a statement expressing its "discontent" with the remarks.

Public Statement and Apology
Mr. Caglayan has also made another statement soon after that by stating that,

 ... I never wanted to offend Jewish people or Jewish belief  in the first place ...

and he said that he does respect all other religions and beliefs like his own and he deeply regrets if his remarks came across  as an Insult.

See also
 2013 corruption scandal in Turkey

References

External links

Biyografi.net bio (Turkish)

1957 births
People from Muş
Living people
Ministers of Economic Affairs of Turkey
Deputies of Ankara
Justice and Development Party (Turkey) politicians
Turkish mechanical engineers
Turkish Kurdish politicians
Deputies of Mersin
Government ministers of Turkey
Members of the 24th Parliament of Turkey
Members of the 23rd Parliament of Turkey
Members of the Grand National Assembly of Turkey
Ministers of State of Turkey
Members of the 60th government of Turkey
Ministers of Science Industry and Technology of Turkey